Frank E. Childs (December 27, 1887 – January 10, 1973) was an American Thoroughbred racehorse trainer. He was the trainer of Tomy Lee who won the 1959 Kentucky Derby. He was inducted into the National Museum of Racing and Hall of Fame in 1968.

Frank Childs served with the United States Army during World War I.

References

1887 births
1973 deaths
United States Army personnel of World War I
American racehorse trainers
People from Cove, Oregon